Public Works, also distributed under the title A Noble Intention is a 2015 Dutch drama film directed by Joram Lürsen. It was based on the book of the same name by Thomas Rosenboom about the troubled construction of the Victoria Hotel in Amsterdam. It was listed as one of eleven films that could be selected as the Dutch submission for the Best Foreign Language Film at the 89th Academy Awards, but it was not nominated. The film won the Pearl Award at the Film by the Sea festival in the Netherlands in 2016.

Plot
The narrative is based on two historic facts: one, the Victoria hotel in Amsterdam, opposite the Central Station, has two nineteenth-century houses incrusted in its facade.  Two, the pharmacist Anijs in Hoogeveen was known for his commitment to improve the lives of a group of families of dirt-poor peat-cutters.

The main character, Walter Vedder, a violin maker, was in the 1880s the owner of one of the houses opposite the Central Station. Aware of his strong position to negotiate, he demands a fortune for his property. Together with his cousins Christian Anijs in Hoogeveen and Al Vedder in the United States, he develops the idea to use this fortune to offer the poor peat-cutters the opportunity to emigrate to the United States. Public works such as in this case the construction of a railway station, can have unforeseen an unwanted effects on the lives of people but the cousins have the noble intention to achieve social justice on their own.

Tragedy is inevitable since the developers are not willing to pay Vedder's price. The poor families from the peatlands embark on an ill-advised journey but are saved by a surprising element of culture that the cousins did not value.

Cast
 Gijs Scholten van Aschat as Walter Vedder
 Jacob Derwig as Anijs
 Rifka Lodeizen as Martha
 Zeb Troostwijk as Klein Pet
 Juda Goslinga as Bennemin
 Elisabeth Hesemans as Mother Bennemin
 Joosje Duk as Johanna Bennemin

References

External links
 

2015 films
2015 drama films
Dutch drama films
2010s Dutch-language films